Henry Townsend may refer to:

Henry Townsend (Norwich) (1626–1695), early American colonist born in Norwich, Norfolk, England
Henry Townsend (Oyster Bay) (1649–1703), American colonist born in Oyster Bay
Henry Townsend (missionary) (1815–1886), Anglican missionary
Henry Townsend (musician) (1909–2006), American blues singer, guitarist and pianist

See also
Henry Townshend (disambiguation)
Harry Everett Townsend (1879–1941), war artist for the United States Army